Power Play is a barbershop quartet based in Michigan. They were the 2003 Barbershop Harmony Society International Quartet Champion. Each member of the quartet is a member of the Slamka family. Power Play was formed in 1988, and won the Pioneer (Michigan) District quartet championship in the fall of 1989. They have competed in international competition 12 times, most recently in Montreal where they earned international gold medals. Jack Slamka is the father of Michael and Mark, and Don is his nephew.

Discography
 The Best Times (1992)
 A Musical Scrapbook (1998)
 Love at Home (2003)

External links
 Official website
 AIC entry

Barbershop Harmony Society
Barbershop quartets
Professional a cappella groups